Eta Cephei (η Cep, η Cephei) is a star in the northern circumpolar constellation of Cepheus. With an apparent visual magnitude of 3.4, this is a third magnitude star that, according to the Bortle Dark-Sky Scale, is readily visible to the naked eye.

Etymology
Eta Cephei, along with α Cephei (Alderamin) and β Cep (Alfirk), were identified as Al Kawākib al Firḳ (الكوكب الفرق), meaning "the Stars of The Flock" by Ulug Beg.  Together with θ Cephei, it form Al Kidr.  Among its other designations includes the name Kabalfird.

Properties
Eta Cephei is a subgiant star with a stellar classification of K0 IV, which indicates it is exhausting the supply of hydrogen at its core and is in the process of evolving into a giant star. With 1.6 times the Sun's mass, at an age of 2.5 billion years it has reached a radius four times larger than the Sun and a luminosity ten times greater. It is radiating this energy from its outer atmosphere at an effective temperature of 4,950 K, giving it the orange-hued glow of a K-type star.

Hunt for substellar objects 

According to Nelson & Angel (1998), Eta Cephei would show two significant periodicities of 164 days and 10 years respectively, hinting at the possible presence of one or more jovian planets in orbit around the subgiant. The authors have set an upper limit of 0.64 Jupiter masses for the putative inner planet and 1.2 Jupiter masses for the putative outer one. Also Campbell et al. (1988) inferred the existence of planetary objects or even brown dwarfs less massive than 16.3 Jupiter masses.

However, more recent studies have not yet confirmed the existence of any substellar companion around Eta Cephei. McDonald Observatory team has set limits to the presence of one or more planets with masses between 0.13 and 2.4 Jupiter masses and average separations spanning between 0.05 and 5.2 AU.

References 

Cephei, Eta
Cepheus (constellation)
Hypothetical planetary systems
K-type subgiants
Cephei, Eta
Cephei, 03
102422
198149
Durchmusterung objects
7957